Dennis Millar may refer to:

Dennis Millar of Buster Brown (Australian band)
Dennis Millar (filmmaker), see Canadian Film Makers (1974 TV series)

See also
Dennis Miller (disambiguation)